Gettysburg is a 2011 American Civil War television documentary film directed by Adrian Moat that was first aired on May 30, 2011 (Memorial Day) on History. This two-hour documentary film, narrated by actor Sam Rockwell, commenced a week of programming by the History channel honoring and commemorating the 150th Anniversary of the American Civil War. Gettysburg showcases the horror of the pivotal 1863 Battle of Gettysburg by following the stories of eight men as they put their lives on the line to fight for what they believed in.

Characters

 Lieutenant Colonel Rufus Dawes voiced by André Sogliuzzo
 Sergeant Amos Humiston voiced by Tyrel Meyer
 Colonel James Wallace voiced by actor Joshua Artis
 Brigadier General William Barksdale
 Brigadier General Joseph R. Davis
 Assistant Surgeon LeGrand Wilson
 Private Joseph C. Lloyd voiced by actor Johnny Ray Meeks
 Private D. Ridgely Howard

Civil War Week
On February 9, 2011, President and General Manager of History channel, Nancy Dubuc, announced the channel's partnership with the Civil War Trust and the National Park Foundation for GIVE 150, a massive educational and fund-raising initiative to enhance Civil War education nationwide, and to protect and preserve battlefields and other key sites from this pivotal period in American history. Dedicated to highlighting the 150th anniversary of the American Civil War an entire week of programming will be set aside featuring various new and old episodes of shows showcasing the war. In 2011 Civil War Week will commence on Memorial Day Monday with war themed episodes of Pawn Stars followed by the television premiere of Gettysburg. Throughout the week there will be new episodes of American Pickers, reruns of Brad Meltzer's Decoded, Modern Marvels and other various shows, along with the premiere of Lee & Grant a television documentary film directed by John Ealer.

Production
The production was filmed in Western Cape, South Africa.

Marketing campaign
Companies which signed on to sponsor the title and the Civil War Week project include Geico, Ram, and Bank of America.

Wanting to entice young and middle aged men to watch the Memorial Day special, senior director of consumer marketing at History Ann Marie Granite, went back to Microsoft's Xbox 360 to help promote the film. Features allow users to compete for prizes by downloading free market content from the Xbox Live store, other features include an interactive map of Gettysburg that provides historical background on each day of battle and campaigning videos that showcase the movie.

See also
 Battle of Gettysburg

References

External links
 
 Takepart.com/Give150

2011 television films
2011 films
American Civil War films
American documentary television films
History (American TV channel) original programming
American independent films
Battle of Gettysburg
2010s English-language films
2010s American films